The men's long jump was one of four jumping events on the Athletics at the 1896 Summer Olympics programme. There were nine contestants in the long jump, held on 7 April. The American jumpers proved themselves dominant in taking the top three spots. The event was won by Ellery Harding Clark. Clark would later win the high jump as well, becoming the only man (through 2016, at least) to win both the high jump and long jump in the Olympics.

Summary

Clark's first two jumps were fouls, but his third was by far the best of the field. He had used his hat as a marker along the runway for the first two jumps, which Constantine I of Greece (acting as the judge in the event) had declared inconsistent with amateurism; the king removed the hat both times. For the third attempt, Clark did not attempt to use the hat.

Background

This was the first appearance of the event, which is one of 12 athletics events to have been held at every Summer Olympics. There were 23 entrants, but only nine men actually started.

Competition format

There was a single round of jumping. Each athlete made three jumps.

Records

There were no standing world records (the IAAF began ratifying records in 1912) or Olympic records (as this was the first Games) before the event. Ellery Harding Clark set the initial Olympic record at 6.35 metres.

Schedule

The exact time of the contest is not known; it was the second event of the afternoon session on Tuesday. The session started at 2:30 p.m.; the long jump came after two heats of the 110 metres hurdles.

Results

As with many early Olympic events, the complete results are unclear and disputed. The table below provides results consistent with the IOC's website results page. The Official Report says that only eight men competed; it lists only four: Chalkokondylis and Skaltsogiannis as the Greeks who competed, and Clark and Garrett as the prize winners. It gives Garrett's distance at 6.00 metres. Olympedia follows the Official Report rather than the IOC results page for Garrett's distance, puts Connolly's best jump at 5.84 metres, gives Chalkokondylis in fourth place (using the 5.74 metres from the IOC), and cites the remaining 5 jumpers all as "also competed" with no distance given; Olympedia also lists the 14 non-starters shown below (though this would make 23 entries rather than the 18 provided by both Olympedia itself and the Official Report). Kluge uses the flat 6 metres for Garrett and puts Connolly's jump (rather than that of Chalkokondylis) at 5.74 metres, marking all six remaining men as "also competed." Zur Megede matches the IOC page through the top five, but Sjöberg is replaced by the Hungarian Desiderius Wein with a distance of 5.64 metres, placing him after Schuhmann; Schuhmann (with the same 5.70 metres as the IOC) is moved up to 6th without Sjöberg and with Chalkokondylis being marked as "also competed." No source lists the results of individual jumps, other than remarking that Clark fouled on his first two attempts and achieved his 6.35 metres on the final one.

References

  (Digitally available at la84foundation.org)
  (Excerpt available at la84foundation.org)
 

Men's jump long
Long jump at the Olympics